Pape Naa Pranam is a 1998 Indian Telugu-language thriller film starring J. D. Chakravarthy. It is a remake of the 1995 American film Nick of Time. The film was dubbed into Hindi and Tamil as Aaj Ka Baadshah and Kolai Kutram.

Cast

 J. D. Chakravarthy as Chakri
 Meena
 Ashish Vidyarthi
 Kota Srinivasa Rao
 Jaya Sudha
 Chandra Mohan
 Chandini
 Ali
 Sunil
 Banerjee
 Kalpana Rai
 Uttej
 Tanikella Bharani
 AVS
 M. S. Narayana
 Baby Ayushi

Music

Release 
The film initially released without a title with the director stating that he would rename the film in fifteen days after the release based on the audience's opinion.

References

1998 films
1990s Telugu-language films
1990 thriller films
Films scored by Koti
Indian thriller films